Khalistan Liberation Force (KLF) is a militant group, and is a part of the Khalistan Movement and its goal to create a Sikh homeland called Khalistan via armed struggle. The KLF appears to have been a loose association of Khalistani militant groups.

History 
The KLF was responsible for several bombings of military targets in India during the 1980s and 1990s, sometimes in conjunction with Kashmir separatists.

KLF was among the Sikh groups that claimed responsibility for the 1991 abduction of the Romanian chargé d'affaires in New Delhi, Liviu Radu.
This appeared to be retaliation for Romanian arrests of KLF members suspected of the attempted assassination of Julio Francis Ribeiro, 62, the Indian ambassador to Romania, in Bucharest.
Radu was released unharmed after Sikh politicians criticized the action.

In the year 1991, Khalistan Liberation Force along with Bhindranwale Tiger Force of Khalistan and Dr. Sohan Singh (Head of Panthic Committee) etc. participated in the secret peace negotiations with India in the city of Ludhiana. These meetings were initiated by Union Minister of State for Home Subodh Kant Sahay on the orders of the (then) Prime Minister of India Chandra Shekhar. It is said that this peace effort was sabotaged by Pakistan's Inter Services Intelligence. Former Indian Intelligence Bureau Joint Director, Maloy Krishna Dhar stated in a press report published by The Hindu that "Prime Minister Benazir Bhutto and her ISI advisers were determined not to let peace succeed.  Pakistan's covert war in Jammu and Kashmir had exploded in 1990, and its establishment understood that the Punjab conflict tied down our troops, and threatened our logistical lines into Jammu and Kashmir." The KLF was listed in 1995 one of the 4 "major militant groups" in the Khalistan movement.

India, in the 1995 era, alleged that Pakistan provided Sikh militants with shelter and support.
The separatist movement was largely crushed in the mid-1990s.

In 1999 it was reported that former KLF operative Manjinder Singh Issi, who took part in the Radu kidnapping, became disillusioned with KLF when he realized that its Pakistani supporters were more interested in disruptive violence in Punjab than Sikh autonomy.

Arrests still occur as of 2005.

The KLF was the primary fighting force of Khalistan movement in the 1980s and 1990s. It was responsible for assassinations, abductions and military engagements with the Indian Forces.

Presence  
Based on the information acquired from the interrogation of three pro-Khalistan militants arrested on 4 August 2014 revealed that Funding of the organisation comes from United Kingdom, Malaysia, Spain and Canada .

Factions 
The Khalistan Liberation Army (KLA) is reputed to have been a wing of, or possibly associated with, or possibly a breakaway group from, the KLF.

Ban 
On 26 December 2018 the Ministry of Home Affairs of Government of India, issued to notification to proscribe the Khalistan Liberation Force as a banned organisation under the Unlawful Activities (Prevention) Act (UAPA).

Leadership
The KLF Jathebandi (organization) was founded by Aroor Singh and Sukhvinder Singh Babbar in 1986.
Other KLF leaders who headed KLF after Aroor Singh were Avtar Singh Brahma (killed by Punjab police 22 July 1988), Gurjant Singh Budhsinghwala (Killed by Indian security forces on 29 July 1992), Navroop Singh (killed by Punjab police on 4 August 1992), and Navneet Singh Khadian (killed 25 Feb 1994). After Navneet Singh Kadian's death, command of the KLF passed to Dr. Pritam Singh Sekhon.

Following Sekhon's death in 1999, the Jathebandi remained a leaderless group, presumed dead, though small activities occurred under its name, heading into the 21st century. This organization was regrouped in 2008 under the leadership of Harminder Singh Nihang after the occurrence of many "Anti-Sikh" incidents in the Punjab state by Dera Sacha Sauda. Harminder Singh Nihang remained as the leader until his death in April 2018 at Patiala jail due to heart attack. Harmeet Singh PHD, the self styled Jathedar, succeeded Harminder Singh until his heart attack in the beginning of 2020. The Jathebandi has remained leaderless ever since.

Notable Activities

1980s
 On 12 December 1987, KLF attacked and killed 9 police personnel in Punjab.

1990s
 Per court case, Khalistan Liberation Force members blew up a portion of police station at Sector 26 Chandigarh, India in July 1990. Per persecution case, Gurcharanjit Singh, Doulat Singh, Gurvinder Singh along with Satwinder Singh and Balwant Singh of the Chandigarh Police executed this action.
 As per Police, Khalistan Liberation force militants killed a minister in Punjab Government Mr. Balwant Singh in Chandigarh in the year of 1990.
 Khalistan Liberation Force attacked and killed 8 RPF (Railway Protection Force) men at Butari railway station in India. As per police, Surjit Singh alias Satta Kaleke, Gursewak Singh alias Fauji and other KLF members also took away 16 rifles of the securitymen.
 In October 1991, KLF kidnapped a Romanian diplomat, Liviu Radu to barter the release of two top militants, Harjinder Singh Jinda and Sukhjinder Singh Sukha.
 On 29 July 1992, Punjab Police killed chief of Khalistan Liberation Force Gurjant Singh Budhsinghwala in Ludhiana, Punjab. On 4 August 1992, Indian police claimed to have killed Khalistan Liberation Force's new chief Navroop Singh Dhotian and four other members in a 20-hour gun battle but later on 29 August 1992 declared that Mr Navrup Singh Dhotian is still alive.
 As per Indian Government's request, Daya Singh Lahoria of the Khalistan Liberation Front was extradited from the U.S to India to face court cases. Lahoria's trial took approximately five years but at the end he was acquitted of the charges because his complicity could not be proved.
 Bail applications of two Khalistan Liberation force members were rejected by an Indian court.
 On 28 October 1998, Indian Police arrested two Khalistan Liberation Force members.
 Punjab Police claimed that two Khalistan Liberation Force militants Manjinder Singh Issi alias Bhushan alias Pappu alias Variety and Sukhjinder Singh alias Lali on 2 March had surrendered to the police in India.
 Punjab Police claimed to have arrested 3 KLF militants on 20 August 1999 and also claimed to have captured a large quantity of ammunition from Jagtar Singh alias Raju of Deluana village in Mansa district; Ram Singh of Karandi in the Tohana police station area of Fatehabad district in Haryana; and Jasbir Singh alias Jassa of Manki village near Malerkotla town in Sangrur district in Punjab.
 Devender Pal Singh, a militant belonging to Khalistan Liberation Force was sentenced to death by an Indian court.
 Indian police claimed to have arrested a KLF member from a village in Punjab.
 India got a KLF militant Jasbir Singh alias Seera extradited from Canada under India-Canada Extradition Treaty and charged him with new sedition cases after he raised pro-Khalistan slogans in Indian courts.

2000s
 In 2008, a member of the KLF launched an attack on the head of Dera Sacha Sauda.
 In 2009 KLF assassinated RSS Punjab President Rulda Singh.
 In 2009 KLF assassinated Dera Sacha Sauda, Srisa Manager Lilly Kumar in Ludhiana.
 In 2009 KLF assassinated 1984 Anti-Sikh Riots main accused Dr. Budh Parkash Kashyap.

2010s
 An investigation report by the National Investigation Agency in 2017 into a series of targeted killings in Punjab including of Rashtriya Swayamsevak Sangh workers, Dera Sacha Sauda and a pastor, stated that Pakistan's Inter-Service Intelligence was taking help of Khalistani extremists to stoke unrest in the state and revive militancy. ISI had taken the help of Khalistan Liberation Force led by Harminder Singh Nihang and Harmeet Singh, reported to be living in Pakistan under ISI cover.
 On 1 Oct 2018, the Government of India initiated steps to ban KLF under the Unlawful Activities Prevention Act (UAPA) after a proposal from the NIA. NIA had claimed that KLF is currently being run by Gursharanbir Singh living in UK and Harmeet Singh living in Pakistan. The two operatives had collected funding from Australia, Italy, Pakistan, UAE and UK and posed a threat to the country. The ban would enable the government to choke its funding, recruitment and training activities. According to Home Ministry of India, KLF will be the 40th organisation to be banned. Other Sikh terrorist groups already banned are Babbar Khalsa International, International Sikh Youth Federation, Khalistan Commando Force and Khalistan Zindabad Force.
 Several KLF operatives named by the NIA in its charge sheet filed in 2018. Jagtar Singh Johal alias Jaggi an NRI and British national was chargesheeted for conspiring to carry out attacks in India. Hardeep Singh from Italy and Ramandeep Singh from Ludhiana were sharpshooters who in October 2017, had murdered a Hindu RSS activist Ravinder Gosain.
 Between February 2016 and October 2017 KLF was involved in eight attacks after which the Indian agencies cracked down on its operatives. KLF in its attacks had targeted Hindu right wing leaders, a Christian pastor and prominent followers of the Dera Sacha Sauda. NIA reported that these attacks were made on the instructions of Pakistani ISI and had the objective to create communal unrest in the Indian Punjab. By destabilizing the law and order in the state, KLF had hoped to revive the Sikh [movement]. The NIA had stated in its charge sheet that "The leadership of KLF believes that it can revive the moribund Khalistan movement by targeting members of specific communities, so as to polarise society in Punjab on communal lines. Organisations and persons who, according to the leadership of the KLF, oppose the ideology of the late Jarnail Singh Bhindranwale are their prime targets for elimination."
 Recently, the Union Minister of State for Home Affairs, G. Kishan Reddy of India said that the KLF was involved in the grenade attack at a prayer hall in Adliwal village, Amritsar on 18 November 2018. He also claimed that during the investigation International Sikh Youth Federation (ISYF) was also found to be involved in the blast. The blast claimed three lives and left 16 injured. However, the Punjab Police arrested three perpetrators responsible for the blast. After the arrest, it was found out that the perpetrators had links with Harmeet Singh Happy, the self-styled chief of KLF.

See also
History of the Punjab
Operation Blue Star
Kharku
Sikh extremism
Sikh nationalism
Terrorism in India

References

Paramilitary organisations based in India
Pro-Khalistan militant outfits
Sikh terrorism in India
Designated terrorist organizations associated with Sikhism
Organisations designated as terrorist by India